It Was Good Until It Wasn't is the second studio album by American singer and songwriter Kehlani. It was released on May 8, 2020, by Atlantic Records. It features guest appearances from Tory Lanez, Jhené Aiko, Masego, Lucky Daye and James Blake, as well as uncredited vocals by Ty Dolla Sign.

Three promotional singles preceded the album's release. "Toxic", "Everybody Business" and "F&MU" were made available on March 12, April 16 and April 30, 2020, respectively. The official lead single "Can I" was released on June 3, 2020. Several of the album's tracks had accompanying music videos that were shot at the singer's home due to the coronavirus pandemic. The album debuted at number two on the US Billboard 200 chart.

Background
On their 25th birthday, Kehlani announced the title and release date of their second studio album. They subsequently shared the album's artwork throughout social media, which finds them peaking over a wall in their garden while holding a water hose. Shortly prior to this, Kehlani signed a worldwide publishing deal with Pulse Music Group which includes their entire music catalog in addition to future works with Pulse's Vice President of A&R citing that, "[Their] talent both as an artist and songwriter is undeniable and seeing [their] career skyrocket in such a short time is incredibly impressive. We can't wait to get to work and to be a part of [their] team in this next stage of [their] career".

In early 2020, Kehlani had a guest appearance on Justin Bieber's fifth studio album Changes on the song "Get Me". They also featured on Megan Thee Stallion's third extended play, Suga. After much anticipation, Kehlani took to their Twitter to announce their "new album is done" and called it their "best work yet". In addition to the album's release, Kehlani also released a handful of singles, including a collaboration featuring singer Keyshia Cole titled "All Me". A duet with rapper YG, who Kehlani also had a relationship with upon the release of the single, titled "Konclusions" was released on Valentine's Day 2020 along with a music video. Just three days after their collaboration, the singer responded with a song titled "Valentine's Day (Shameful)" on which they confirmed their break up. The song was released on SoundCloud and was released on additional streaming services later on.  “You Know Wassup”, which was released in November 2019, detailed some of the struggles during their relationship with YG as well.

Marketing and sales
On March 12, 2020, Kehlani released "Toxic", the first promotional single of the project. The song addresses the fraught aspects of a toxic relationship. The song peaked at number 68 on the Billboard Hot 100. The album's second promotional single, "Everybody Business" was released on April 16. "F&MU" was released on April 30 along with the album's pre-order as the project's third promotional single. All of the songs were accompanied by "Quarantine Style" visuals and music videos.

The album was released on May 8, 2020, by Atlantic Records. The album was made available for pre-order on April 30 alongside the song "F&MU". Kehlani was set to embark on the Changes Tour alongside Justin Bieber.  The tour was set to begin on May 14 but was postponed due to the effects of the coronavirus pandemic.

In its first week of release, It Was Good Until It Wasn't debuted at number two on the US Billboard 200 chart, based on 83,000 album-equivalent units earned (including 25,000 copies of pure album sales). This became Kehlani's second album to reach the US top five. The album also accumulated a total of 74.68 million on-demand streams of the album's songs during the tracking week.

On June 3, 2020, "Can I" was released as the album's first official single. The songs "Open (Passionate)" and "Bad News" received music videos on May 8 and July 9, respectively.

Critical reception

It Was Good Until It Wasn't was met with generally positive reviews. At Metacritic, which assigns a normalized rating out of 100 to reviews from professional publications, the album received an average score of 77, based on 13 reviews. Aggregator AnyDecentMusic? gave it 7.3 out of 10, based on their assessment of the critical consensus, while Album of the Year assessed the critical consensus as a 72 out of 100, based on 13 reviews.

Shakeena Johnson of Clash wrote that "The album's arrangement of serenading beats and jazzy undertones has genuinely proven that Kehlani is a force to be reckoned with." Johnson also called the album Kehlanis "best project to date." The Guardians reviewer Alexis Petridis opined that "It Was Good Until It Wasn't is an album so concise and focused that songs regularly clock in just a shade over two minutes, and which offers a succession of 21st-century reboots of the old-fashioned R&B slow jam." While Petridis noted that "everything proceeds at pretty much the same pace – languorous crawl to the bedroom", he praised the album for its variety and for not sounding monotonous. Writing for The Independent, Roisin O'Connor stated that the album's "15 tracks waft in as though carried by a summer breeze; Kehlani's crystalline vocals shine through arrangements of sedate beats, jazz piano motifs, and luxurious twangs of Spanish guitar." O'Connor further noted that Kehlani demonstrates their "profound emotional intelligence" on the album and he also praised the features on the record. Pitchforks reviewer Stephen Kearse noted the album's production as more moody than previous releases by Kehlani, writing that it replaces "the sunny, poppy swells of SweetSexySavage with cloudy grooves that rock and sway rather than ascend and drop." Kearse called the record a bit diffuse at times, referring to the lack of distinct characters in Kehlani's storytelling. However, he praised them for showcasing their development as an artist, stating that they're "becoming an increasingly agile performer, rapping, singing, and everything in between."

Some reviews were more mixed. Hannah Mylrea of NME stated that the problem with the record is that "it loses sight of the sheer brilliance Kehlani has demonstrated on previous releases. The dark and sexy new songs shine their brightest when coated with a layer of [their] previous sparkle; which makes the artist's second album a fine but frustrating release." Ben Devlin of musicOMH stated that the album contains some filler songs, while noting the tracks "Can I" and "Lexii's Outro" as highlights. Devlin also directed praise towards Kehlani's songwriting and vocal performances. Exclaim!s reviewer Veracia Ankrah opined that the album's drawback is the lack of cohesiveness within its storytelling. However, Ankrah noted the songs "Bad News", "Everybody Business" and "Open (Passionate)" as highlights on the record, stating that those tracks are "showcasing elements of Kehlani's strongest contributions to music thus far, and highlighting [their] ability to make vulnerability a strength."

Reviewing in his Substack-published "Consumer Guide" column, Robert Christgau appreciated how Kehlani "conceives sex almost exclusively as pleasure rather than power, and as eros too—that is, love, which can hurt plenty emotionally but in physical form generally feels good", as well as the presence of clothes as a thematic device in the songs' narratives. In conclusion, he wrote, "I can't think of another album that more vividly respects and evokes not just the physical sensations of sexual love, which is rare enough, but the emotions those sensations entail and intensify in a woman who’d 'rather argue than sleep alone.'"

Rankings

Track listing
Credits adapted from Tidal.

Notes
 "Toxic" features uncredited background vocals by Ty Dolla Sign.
 "Can I" contains an interpolation of "Come Over", as performed by Aaliyah.
 "Everybody Business" contains an interpolation of "Frontin'” as performed by Pharrell Williams.
 On later digital versions of the album, Tory Lanez's verse in "Can I" is absent. In place of it, Kehlani sings another verse. Physical versions, however, retain Tory's verse.

Charts

Weekly charts

Year-end charts

References

2020 albums
Kehlani albums
Atlantic Records albums
Albums produced by Jake One
Albums produced by Boi-1da
Albums produced by Mars (record producer)
Albums produced by Oak Felder